Wilsonville is a populated place in Boyle County, Kentucky. It is part of the Danville, KY Micropolitan Statistical Area. Former NFL player Jim Marshall was born in Wilsonville in 1937.

References

Unincorporated communities in Boyle County, Kentucky
Unincorporated communities in Kentucky